The  Green Bay Packers season was their 48th season overall and their 46th in the National Football League (NFL). The defending NFL champions had a league-best regular season record of 12–2, led by eighth-year head coach Vince Lombardi and quarterback Bart Starr, in his eleventh NFL season.

The Packers beat the Dallas Cowboys in the NFL championship game, the Packers' second consecutive NFL title, fourth under Lombardi, and tenth for the franchise. Two weeks later, the Packers recorded a 35–10 victory over the Kansas City Chiefs in the inaugural AFL-NFL Championship Game, retroactively known as Super Bowl I.

Quarterback Starr was named the league's most valuable player (MVP) in 1966. Said Cold Hard Football Facts about Starr's 1966 season, "Starr, always underappreciated, was at his classic assassin-like best in 1966, his lone MVP season. He led the league in completion percentage, yards per attempt and passer rating, while his 4.7-to-1 [touchdown-to-interception] ratio remains one of the very best in history. Starr, as always, cranked out great performances when he absolutely had to: the 1966 Packers, for example, were the worst rushing team in football, with a meager average of 3.5 [yards-per-attempt] on the ground, despite the reputation Lombardi's Packers still carry with them today as a dominant running team." Cold Hard Football Facts also notes that 1966 Packers had the best passer rating differential (offensive passer rating minus opponents passer rating), +56.0, in the Super Bowl Era.

In 2007, the 1966 Packers were ranked as the sixth greatest Super Bowl champions on the NFL Network's documentary series America's Game: The Super Bowl Champions, with team commentary from Bill Curry, Willie Davis, and Bart Starr, and narrated by Donald Sutherland. More than a decade later, this team ranked #13 on the 100 greatest teams of all time presented by the NFL on its 100th anniversary.

Offseason 
The Washington Redskins made overtures to Vince Lombardi about becoming their new head coach. Lombardi refused their offer and the Redskins had to settle for Otto Graham as their new head coach. Lombardi replaced Graham in Washington in 1969.

NFL draft 
In the 1966 NFL draft, held in late November 1965, the Packers selected running back Jim Grabowski of Illinois with the ninth overall pick. Common for pro football in the mid-1960s, the Packers found themselves in a bidding war for Grabowski. The expansion Miami Dolphins of the American Football League selected Grabowski with the first overall selection of the AFL Draft, held the same day. Lombardi's plan was to groom Grabowski to take over for Jim Taylor at fullback. Despite being offered more money by the Dolphins, Grabowski said it was an honor to be drafted by the Packers. Grabowski signed with the Packers and landed on the cover of Sports Illustrated in August, with veteran backfield tandem Paul Hornung and Taylor on the main cover and rookies Grabowski and Donny Anderson on the foldout. The signing of Grabowski upset Taylor, who felt that he was underpaid and made it publicly known that he would leave Green Bay once his contract expired. Taylor had been given an offer by the expansion Atlanta Falcons, but agreed to honor his contract before moving to another team and played out his option in 1966.

Fellow rookie running back Anderson of Texas Tech was the seventh overall selection of the 1965 draft as an underclassman, and he stayed in school for his senior season in 1965. Due to their large contracts, signed during the height of the pre-merger bidding war with the AFL, as well as their high visibility as the apparent replacements for Hornung and Taylor, Anderson and Grabowski were nicknamed the "Gold Dust Twins."

The 1966 draft (November 1965) was the last one held separately for the two leagues. Following the merger agreement of June 1966, a common draft was conducted in March 1967.

Roster

Preseason

Regular season 

The defending champion Packers finished the regular season with a league best record of 12–2, returning them to the NFL championship game as Western Conference champions. Until , NFL playoff sites were rotated, so the Eastern Conference champion Dallas Cowboys (10–3–1) hosted the title game in 1966 at the Cotton Bowl on January 1, 1967.

Schedule 

 Saturday (September 10, December 10)

Standings

Game summaries

Week 1 vs. Baltimore Colts

Week 2: at Cleveland Browns

Week 3: vs. Los Angeles Rams

Week 4: vs. Detroit Lions

Week 5: at San Francisco 49ers

Week 6: at Chicago Bears

Week 7: vs. Atlanta Falcons

Week 8: at Detroit Lions

Week 9: vs. Minnesota Vikings

Week 10: vs. Chicago Bears

Week 11: at Minnesota Vikings

Week 12: vs. San Francisco 49ers

Week 13: at Baltimore Colts 

Zeke Bratkowski relieved Bart Starr, who suffered a muscle spasm in the first half. Bratkowski directed an 80-yard drive in the fourth quarter that resulted in a go-ahead touchdown run by Elijah Pitts. John Unitas then led the Colts to the Green Bay 15, but there lost a fumble which came to be known as the 'Million Dollar Fumble', to secure the Packers' win that clinched the Western Conference crown.

Week 14: at Los Angeles Rams

Postseason

NFL Championship Game 

Green Bay took an early 14–0 lead on two first-quarter scores; a 17-yard touchdown pass from Bart Starr to Elijah Pitts and an 18-yard fumble return by Jim Grabowski on the ensuing kickoff. The Cowboys tied the score with two touchdowns towards the end of the quarter.

Starr's third touchdown pass of the game gave the Packers a 34–20 lead with 5:20 left in the game, but the Cowboys responded with a 68-yard touchdown pass from Don Meredith to Frank Clarke. Dallas advanced to the Green Bay 22-yard line on their next drive, when a pass interference penalty gave the Cowboys a first down at the Packer 2-yard line. But Green Bay's Tom Brown intercepted a Meredith pass in the end zone with 28 seconds left to play to preserve the victory for the Packers.

With the win, the Packers earned their 10th NFL championship. It was their second in a row and fourth in six seasons.

Super Bowl I 

The first AFL-NFL World Championship Game in professional American football, later known as Super Bowl I, was played on January 15, 1967, at the Los Angeles Memorial Coliseum in Los Angeles, California. The Packers faced the Kansas City Chiefs from the AFL, who finished their regular season at 11–2–1.

In the week prior to the game, the Packers practiced at UC Santa Barbara, and the Chiefs at Veterans Field in Long Beach.

The Packers jumped out to an early 7–0 lead with Bart Starr's 37-yard touchdown pass to reserve receiver Max McGee, who had been put into the game just a few plays earlier to fill in for injured starter Boyd Dowler. Early in the second quarter, Kansas City marched 66 yards in 6 plays to tie the game on a 7-yard pass from quarterback Len Dawson to Curtis McClinton. But the Packers responded on their next drive, advancing 73 yards down the field and scoring on fullback Jim Taylor's 14-yard touchdown run with the team's famed "Power Sweep" play. The Chiefs then cut the lead with a minute left in the half, 14–10, on Mike Mercer's 31-yard field goal.

Early in the second half Dawson was intercepted by defensive back Willie Wood. He returned the interception 50 yards to the Kansas City 5-yard line. On the next play Elijah Pitts rushed 5-yards for a touchdown, giving the Packers a 21–10 lead. Max McGee scored his second touchdown of the game with a 13-yard reception from Bart Starr. The Packers held the Chiefs' offense to 12 yards in the third quarter. Elijah Pitts scored another touchdown for the Packers in the third quarter on a one-yard touchdown run. The Packers would win the game 35–10. Quarterback Bart Starr was named the MVP of the game, completing 16 of 23 passes for 250 yards and two touchdowns.

Season statistical leaders 
 Passing yards: Bart Starr, 2,257
 Passing touchdowns: Bart Starr, 14
 Rushing yards: Jim Taylor, 705
 Rushing touchdowns: Elijah Pitts, 7
 Receiving yards: Carroll Dale, 876
 Receiving touchdowns: Carroll Dale, 7
 Points: Don Chandler, 77
 Kickoff return yards: Donny Anderson, 533
 Punt return yards: Donny Anderson, 124
 Interceptions: Bob Jeter and Dave Robinson, 5

Awards and records 
 Bart Starr, NFL leader, passing yards, (2,257 yards)
 Bart Starr, NFL MVP
 Bart Starr, Super Bowl most valuable player

References

External links 
 1966 Green Bay Packers at database football
 1966 Green Bay Packers at pro football reference

Green Bay Packers
National Football League championship seasons
Green Bay Packers seasons
Super Bowl champion seasons
Green